The 1933 World Table Tennis Championships men's singles was the seventh edition of the men's singles championship. 

Viktor Barna defeated Stanislav Kolář in the final, winning three sets to one.

Results

References

-